Kasimovo is a rural locality (a village) in Lobanovskoye Rural Settlement, Permsky District, Perm Krai, Russia. The population was 317 as of 2010. There are 6 streets.

Geography 
Kasimovo is located 34 km south of Perm (the district's administrative centre) by road. Baskiye is the nearest rural locality.

References 

Rural localities in Permsky District